Hatchet is a 2006 American slasher film written and directed by Adam Green. The film has an ensemble cast, including Joel David Moore, Kane Hodder, Deon Richmond, Tamara Feldman, Richard Riehle, Mercedes McNab, Robert Englund, and Tony Todd. In the style of old-school slasher films, such as Friday the 13th, the plot follows a group of tourists on a New Orleans haunted swamp tour, who accidentally get stranded in the wilderness, only to be hunted by a vengeful, supernatural deformed man who kills anyone that enters the swamp. The film spawned three sequels—Hatchet II, Hatchet III, and Victor Crowley—and a comic book series.

Plot

Sampson and his son Ainsley are hunting alligators in a swamp. While Ainsley is urinating, Sampson falls silent; Ainsley finds Sampson dead before he too is killed by a monstrous being.

During a Mardi Gras celebration in New Orleans, a group of friends including Ben and his best friend Marcus decide to go on a haunted swamp tour. They find the tour closed because the guide, Rev. Zombie, was sued for negligence. Rev. Zombie suggests they try a place farther down the street, owned by the over-the-top, inexperienced tour guide Shawn. Marcus decides to leave but changes his mind upon seeing two topless girls: Misty, a ditzy porn star, and Jenna, a bossy, boastful, up-and-coming actress. Their sleazy director, Doug Shapiro, is also present. Ben pays for himself and Marcus and Shawn leads them to his tour bus, where the other tourists, Jim and Shannon Permatteo, a Minnesota married couple, and the hot-tempered Marybeth are waiting.

Shawn does not know what he is doing, which the others realize as they arrive at the swamp. Shapiro has Misty and Jenna strip down and film a scene for Bayou Beavers as everyone boards the boat, while a homeless swamp-dweller named Jack Cracker warns them away from the swamp. Shawn leads them through swamplands and past abandoned houses, including one where Victor Crowley, a deformed creature, lived. The boat hits a rock and begins sinking, leaving them stranded.

As the crew walks through the woods, Jim is bitten on the leg by an alligator. While finding their way out of the woods, the group  encounter the old Crowley house, and Marybeth shares the legend of Victor Crowley. Victor was a deformed child with a rare disease, bullied by other kids and was kept hidden by his father, Thomas Crowley. One night a group of teenagers threw fireworks at it to scare Victor. The house began burning, and Victor was killed when Thomas accidentally hit him in the face with a hatchet while trying to break down the door. Marybeth claims that Victor roams the swamp at night as a vengeful spirit, crying for his father, and that they are not safe in the woods, but the crew doesn't believe her.

As Jim and Shannon approach the house, Victor appears and kills them, causing the group to flee. Marybeth shoots Victor with a handgun, but he gets up and resumes his pursuit. Shapiro splits from the group and is killed by Victor. The remaining survivors decide to return to the house where they can arm themselves.

While at the house, Marybeth and Ben discover her brother and father's remains. Marcus, Shawn, Misty and Jenna hear a noise in a bush. Marcus goes to investigate and discovers that it was only a raccoon. Victor then surprises the group and injures Jenna with a belt sander. Marybeth and Ben return and attack Victor. While the other survivors flee, Shawn tries fighting Victor, but instead is killed. Victor then kills Jenna.

The survivors decide to lure Victor back to his house and set him on fire with the gasoline tanks in the shed. Ben goes into the shed to retrieve a gasoline tank while Misty stands guard and Marybeth and Marcus act as bait. Marybeth and Marcus discover that Misty is missing, and her corpse is thrown onto Ben by Victor. Ben finds a tank and throws it on Victor while Marybeth and Marcus set him on fire, but rain extinguishes him. They start fleeing, but Victor grabs and kills Marcus. Victor grabs a gate pole and chases Ben and Marybeth, throwing it into Ben's foot. Marybeth bends the pole until it is pointed at Victor, who impales himself upon it and collapses, apparently killed. Ben and Marybeth flee in Sampson's boat; Marybeth is ensnared by seaweed and pulled underwater. She sees Ben's arm sticking into the water for her to grab, but is pulled up and grabbed by a screaming Victor, who is holding a dying Ben's severed forearm. She screams in horror.

Cast

Production

Development 
Director Adam Green said that he got the idea for Victor Crowley's backstory when he attended Camp Avoda in 1983 at age 8. During the first day at camp, the counsellors had warned the kids that a man named Hatchet-Face would "come and get them" if they got near a particular cabin. Since Green was starting to get into horror movies, he decided to make up a backstory for Hatchet-Face, which he told to the rest of the kids in his cabin that same night. This backstory, which involved a deformed boy accidentally being killed by his father who was trying to save him from a housefire, was eventually re-used for Victor Crowley's origin story.

In an attempt to ensue financing for the film, producer Sarah Elbert convinced Green and cinematographer Will Barratt to shoot a brief teaser trailer in New Oreleans before writing the script. The teaser simply consisted of establishing shots that Barratt filmed during a swamp tour, with narration done by the young daughter of one of Elbert's friends relaying Victor's backstory. The teaser was met with widespread praise upon release, and Green was able to earn sufficient funding for the film.

Production 
Principal photography for the film began on April 25, 2005, with the film being shot around Sable Ranch in Santa Clarita.

Release
Hatchet was selected for the 2006 London FrightFest Film Festival at The Odeon West End on August 25, 2006. It was introduced on stage by Adam Green who hosted a Q&A session afterwards.

Hatchet was selected for Sitges International Film Festival in Spain in 2006.

Hatchet was selected for Fantastic Fest in Austin, Texas, in 2006. The film sold out both nights, resulting in extra folding chairs having to be set up in the theater and audience members sitting in the aisles.  The film won the audience award for "Best Picture" as well as jury prizes for "Best Actor" (Kane Hodder) and "Best Special Effects".

Hatchet was selected for Germany's Fantasy Film Festival in 2006. As part of the festival, the film toured Munich, Stuttgart, Nuremberg, Frankfurt, Cologne, Bochum, Hamburg and Berlin.

Reception
Hatchet received mixed reviews from critics.
Peter Bradshaw from The Guardian awarded the film 2 out of 5 stars calling the film, "A reasonably serviceable horror [film]".
Marc Savlov from Austin Chronicle gave the film 3 1/2 out of 5 stars, praising the film's "quippy dialogue", orchestral score, and gore effects.
Bloody Disgusting gave the film a positive review, praising the film's 80's slasher film style, calling it "A bloody great ride".

Based on 49 reviews collected by Rotten Tomatoes, Hatchet has an overall 55% approval rating from critics, with an average score of 5.53/10. The consensus states, "The over-the-top gore, campy acting, and dim cinematography may be part of Hatchet'''s self-described old-school ethos, but irony alone can't sustain a horror film." On Metacritic, the film has a weighted average score of 57 out of 100, based on 8 reviews.

Home mediaHatchet was released on DVD on December 18, 2007. There are two versions available, the original theatrical cut and the unrated director's cut, the latter having an extra minute of gore. The film reportedly made $6 million in U.S. rentals during its first three weeks of release. The film has sold over 597,022 units in North America, translating into $8,262,721. The film was released on Blu-ray on September 7, 2010.

Legacy

In November 2008, Anchor Bay Entertainment released a teaser poster for a sequel, Hatchet II, and Green returned to direct the film. Hodder returned as Victor Crowley/Mr. Crowley, with Todd returning as Reverend Zombie, and Buechler as Jack Cracker. New in the cast were R.A. Mihailoff and Danielle Harris, who took over the role of Marybeth.Hatchet II follows Marybeth as she escapes from Crowley's clutches, learns the truth about his curse, and heads back into the haunted New Orleans swamp to seek revenge for her family and to kill Crowley once and for all. Green confirmed on March 29, 2010, the extension of the series to two more sequels, and has expressed interest.Hatchet III has the police finding the bodies of the first two films' victims on the island and Marybeth is the chief suspect. Meanwhile, a reporter bent on the belief of Victor Crowley takes a deputy and Marybeth out to prove the legend.Victor Crowley'', the fourth installment, was released in August 2017.

References

External links
 
 
 
 

Hatchet (film series)
2006 films
2006 horror films
American splatter films
2000s comedy horror films
2000s slasher films
American independent films
American slasher films
Films directed by Adam Green
Films shot in New Orleans
2006 comedy films
American exploitation films
2000s English-language films
2000s American films